Thomas Cochrane Highet (28 August 1853 – 26 January 1907) was a Scottish footballer, who played for Queen's Park and represented Scotland four times.

Higher was born in Ayr and was educated at Ayr Academy. He joined Queen's Park after moving to the Glasgow area in 1873.

Highet also played cricket, representing Clydesdale, Ayr Eglinton and Granville.

Personal life 
Thomas' son John was also a footballer for Queen's Park.

References

Sources

1853 births
1907 deaths
Association football inside forwards
Scottish footballers
Scotland international footballers
Queen's Park F.C. players
Footballers from Ayr
People educated at Ayr Academy